Hussain Quli Beg was a Mughal military vassall (mansabdar) with the rank of 5000 soldiers. He was later entitled as Khān-i-Jahān (Khan of the World) by Emperor Akbar.

Early life
Beg was the son of Wali Beg Zul-Qadr and the nephew of Bairam Khan. He began his career as an ordinary soldier in Akbar's army, but was then imprisoned for supporting his uncle Bairam's revolt against the Empire. He was later pardoned by Akbar and continued his work as a loyal soldier.

History
He was appointed as the Subahdar (Governor) of Bengal after the death of Munim Khan in 1575. Daud Khan Karrani, the final Afghan Sultan of Bengal, rebelled against the Mughal Empire for the second time. On 12 July 1576, the Battle of Rajmahal commenced and Khan Jahan successfully defeated the Sultan. Karrani was executed and his head was sent to Agra. Khan Jahan also took Satgaon under his control.

Khan Jahan led military expedition against the Baro-Bhuiyans in 1578. In a naval battle in Katsul against Isa Khan, the ruler of Bhati, he failed to capture the area and retreated. He later died in Tanda, the erstwhile capital of Bengal, in 1578.

References

Mughal nobility
Subahdars of Bengal
1578 deaths
Year of birth unknown
16th-century Indian Muslims